The Luther League is a Lutheran religious association for young people in the United States of America. It began with a local society founded by delegates of six Lutheran church societies in New York City in 1888. The first national convention was held in Pittsburgh, Pennsylvania, on 30 and 31 October 1895. The basis of the league is the Augsburg Confession. Its membership is open to any society of whatever name connected with a Lutheran congregation or a Lutheran institution of learning. According to the constitution, its objects are to encourage the formation of the young people's societies in all Lutheran congregations in America, to urge their affiliation with their respective state or territorial leagues, and with this league to stimulate the various young people's societies to greater Christian activity and to foster the spirit of loyalty to the church. The league publishes a monthly paper, The Luther League Review, in Washington. According to its official report, it had 70,000 members in 1906, which had increased to more than 100,000 in 1910.

See also
 Catholic Youth Organization

Notes

References

External links

Religious organizations established in 1888
Lutheran organizations
Christian youth organizations
Youth organizations based in the United States